Nathaniel Dimsdale, FRS (11 April 1748 – 3 July 1811), a British physician and MP who received a Barony of the Russian Empire for his work in Russia on smallpox vaccination.

He was the second son of the Quaker Thomas Dimsdale, a Hertfordshire physician, banker and MP and was educated at Eton School. After travelling with his father to St Petersburg in 1768 to inoculate Catherine the Great and her son Grand Duke Paul against smallpox, he, along with his father, received an annuity and was created Baron Dimsdale of the Russian Empire. On his return he studied medicine at the University of Edinburgh graduating with an MB in 1771.

He returned to Russia with his father in 1781 to carry out further inoculations within the Russian royal family. He became a partner in the family bank of Baron Dimsdale, Sons, Barnard and Staples established by his father. When his father retired in 1790 he succeeded to his father's Parliamentary seat for Hertford, holding it until 1802.

In 1805 he was elected a Fellow of the Royal Society.

By then he was not in good health and died on a trip for his heath to Brighton in 1811. He was unmarried and left his estate to his sister Ann Dimsdale. His barony lapsed on his death but that of his father passed down in the family via his elder brother John.

References

1748 births
1811 deaths
People from Hertfordshire
People educated at Eton College
Barons of the Russian Empire
Alumni of the University of Edinburgh
English bankers
Members of the Parliament of Great Britain for English constituencies
British MPs 1790–1796
British MPs 1796–1800
Members of the Parliament of the United Kingdom for English constituencies
UK MPs 1801–1802
Fellows of the Royal Society